Juan Morano Masa (5 December 1941 – 4 May 2018) was a Spanish politician who was a member of the Congress of Deputies from 2004 to 2015.. He also served as the Mayor of León from 1979 to 1987 and from 1989 to 1995.

References

1941 births
2018 deaths
Mayors of places in Castile and León
Members of the 8th Congress of Deputies (Spain)
Members of the 9th Congress of Deputies (Spain)
Members of the 10th Congress of Deputies (Spain)
People from León, Spain